Macrostomus acreanus is a species of dance flies, in the fly family Empididae.

References

Macrostomus
Insects described in 2015
Diptera of South America